Teymour Ghiasi (born 12 April 1946) is a retired Iranian high jumper. He competed at the 1972 and 1976 Olympics and placed 22nd–25th. Ghiasi won gold medals at the Asian Games in 1970 and 1974 and a bronze in 1966. At the 1974 Asian Games he set a new Asian record at 2.21 meters.

In 1967 Ghiasi married a fellow high jumper Nusrat. They have a son Alireza (born 1970) and a daughter Pantea.

References

External links

 
  Biography
 www.sports-reference.com

1946 births
Living people
Iranian male high jumpers
Olympic athletes of Iran
Athletes (track and field) at the 1972 Summer Olympics
Athletes (track and field) at the 1976 Summer Olympics
Asian Games gold medalists for Iran
Asian Games bronze medalists for Iran
Asian Games medalists in athletics (track and field)
Athletes (track and field) at the 1966 Asian Games
Athletes (track and field) at the 1970 Asian Games
Athletes (track and field) at the 1974 Asian Games
People from Dargaz
Medalists at the 1966 Asian Games
Medalists at the 1970 Asian Games
Medalists at the 1974 Asian Games